Jeong Hoseung, also Jeong Ho-seung (born 1950), is a popular South Korean poet.

Life
Born in South Gyeongsang Province in 1950, Jeong Hoseung grew up in Daegu, and graduated with a degree in Korean literature from Kyung Hee University. That same year, he began to contribute to the literary magazine 반시(反詩) (Against Poetry), and published his first novel, Memorial Service (1982). He was the winner of the Tenth Dong Seo Literary Prize in 1997, also winning the Sowol Poetry Prize

Career
Jeong's themes include societal schisms, poverty and alienation, but his work presents these themes with lyrical grace and innocence that removes any trace of hectoring. Jeong intentionally focuses on suffering in the hope that in despair some hope can be found and that this can become the basis for a more successful future. The poet also depicts the resentment and enmity that stirs in the hearts of farmers and workers whose very roots have been taken from them in a sterile South Korean society, and their attempts to resist and overcome these conditions. He spoke for the masses and took as his poetic duty, praising people for their willful and courageous attitude toward life and helping them believe in their future.

Jeong Hoseung's style of writing has often been described as being similar to traditional Korean folk songs or popular ballads.

Selected works

Works in Korean (partial)

Poetry collections
 Sorrow to Joy (1979)
 Jesus in Seoul (1982)
 Sunrise Letter (1987)
 The Stars Are Warm (1990)
 The Unshakable Reed (1991)
 Die in Love (1997)
 Because I Am Lonely, I Am Human (1998)
 When Tears Come, Take the Train (1999)
 The Person I Love
 For This Short Time (2004)
 Embrace (2007)
 The Cost of Rice (2010)
 Wayfaring (2013)
 To the Daffodil (2015)
 A Letter Not Sent (2016) - bilingual (English and Korean) 
 Though Flowers Fall I Have Never Forgotten You (2016) - bilingual (English and Korean)
 I Refuse Hope (2017)

Children's books
 The Magpie That Flew to the Sea (1996)
 The Sorrows of Emily Jong

Works in Translation
 Five poems in Azalea: Journal of Korean Literature and Culture (2011) - translated by Mia You
 "Snail" in Alchemy: Journal of Translation (2012) - translated by Mia You
 "South Han River" in Alchemy: Journal of Translation (2012) - translated by Mia You
 Though Flowers Fall I Have Never Forgotten You: The Collected Poems of Jeong Ho-seung (2016) - translated by Brother Anthony of Taizé and Susan Hwang
 Loving (2020) - translated by Brother Anthony of Taizé
 Lonesome Jar: Poetic Fables (2020) - translated by Brother Anthony of Taizé

Awards
 Hankook Ilbo New Spring Literary Contest (1972)
 Sowol Poetry Prize (1989)
 Chosun Ilbo New Spring Literary Contest (1973)
 Daehan Daily New Spring Literary Contest (1973)
 Chosun Ilbo New Spring Literary Contest (1982)
 Jeong Jiyong Literature Prize (2000) - for "Heaven's Net"

References

External links
 Poem 산낙지를 위하여 with a German translation
 About the poet

20th-century South Korean poets
1950 births
Living people
Kyung Hee University alumni
South Korean male poets
Jeong Jiyong Literature Prize winners
20th-century male writers